Zee Vajwa was a Marathi pay television channel broadcasting Marathi music or songs by Zee Entertainment Enterprises. It was launched on 17 October 2020.

References

External links
Zee Vajwa on ZEE5

Zee Entertainment Enterprises
Marathi-language television channels